Nicola Caricola (born 13 February 1963) is an Italian former footballer who played as a sweeper.

Career
At club level, Caricola played for Bari, Juventus, Genoa, and Torino in Italy. In 1995, he had an unsuccessful trial with English side Aston Villa. He finished out his career with the New York / New Jersey MetroStars of Major League Soccer, playing with them during the league's inaugural season in 1996. Although Caricola played well for the team, he is most remembered for the own goal he scored in the dying seconds of the club's first home game, a 1–0 loss to New England Revolution. He retired in February 1997.

References

External links
Profile at lega-calcio.it
Read more about Nicola Caricola's professional venture in the espresso industry

1963 births
Living people
Italian footballers
S.S.C. Bari players
Juventus F.C. players
Genoa C.F.C. players
Torino F.C. players
New York Red Bulls players
Serie A players
Serie B players
Major League Soccer players
Footballers from Bari
Italian expatriate footballers
Italy under-21 international footballers
Italian emigrants to South Africa
Expatriate soccer players in the United States
New York Red Bulls draft picks
Association football defenders